Antipterna ptychomochla is a species of  moth in the family Oecophoridae, first described by Alfred Jefferis Turner in 1940 as Antiterpna ptychomochla (sic). The species epithet derives from the Greek, πτυκομοχλοσ, meaning "with bar on fold".

Distribution
It appears to be a moth endemic to Australia and found in South Australia and New South Wales, with occurrences near the confluence of the Murray and the Darling rivers. Turner described specimens from Merredin in Western Australia.

References

External links
Antipterna ptychomochla: images & occurrence data from GBIF

Oecophorinae
Moths described in 1940
Taxa named by Alfred Jefferis Turner